Emma Wareus (born 28 July 1990 in Gaborone) is a Botswana model and beauty queen who placed first runner-up to Miss World 2010 on October 30, 2010, in Sanya, China. This is the highest placement for a woman from her country in the history of the pageant, and the highest placement of a Botswana beauty queen since Mpule Kwelagobe won Miss Universe 1999.

References

Living people
1990 births
Botswana female models
Miss World 2010 delegates
People from Gaborone